The women's 200 metres event at the 1970 Summer Universiade was held at the Stadio Comunale in Turin on 4 and 5 September 1970.

Medalists

Results

Heats
Held on 4 September

Semifinals
Held on 5 September

Final
Held on 5 September

References

Athletics at the 1970 Summer Universiade
1970